Alexandrovka is a rural locality (a selo) and the administrative center of Alexandrovskoye Rural Settlement, Zhirnovsky District, Volgograd Oblast, Russia. The population was 1,030 as of 2010. There are 26 streets.

Geography 
Alexandrovka is located 14 km north of Zhirnovsk (the district's administrative centre) by road. Medveditsa is the nearest rural locality.

References 

Rural localities in Zhirnovsky District
Atkarsky Uyezd